The Military Police of the Estonian Defence Forces is the military police unit of the Estonian Defence Forces. The Estonian military police organization was created in 1994 and its structure includes an investigative department, planning department, logistics department, operational service and the office of the military police. Additionally conscript based reserve- MP platoons are trained every year in Guard Battalion, which is subordinate to the military police. The tasks of the military police include: investigation of serious disciplinary cases and some armed service- related crimes, supervision of military discipline within the Forces, military traffic control and various security tasks. Within conflict/crises areas (Afghanistan) the MP may provide close protection of the Estonian national representative and other visiting VIPs.

Some units of the Estonian Military Police were deployed in Kosovo during the NATO KFOR mission. The members of the military police were assigned to the Italian led Multinational Specialized Unit.

References

Estonia
Military units and formations of Estonia
Military units and formations established in 1994
1994 establishments in Estonia